Skil is a manufacturer of power tools

Skil or SKIL may also refer to:

Skil (cycling team), a French road-racing team 1984–1986
Skilfish
Sablefish
SKIL, a gene
Schunck's KledingIndustrie Limburg, a German clothing company, a predecessor to Schunck

See also 
 Skill (disambiguation)